The Challenge: Free Agents is the 25th season of the MTV reality game show The Challenge. The season is located in Uruguay and Chile, with former cast members from MTV's The Real World and The Challenge competing. This season marks the first since season 11 that does not include any cast members from The Real World: Austin or the first Fresh Meat challenge. The season follows a new format, featuring each contestant competing in either teams, pairs, or for themselves, for a share of $350,000 in prize money.

The season premiered with a special 90-minute episode on April 10, 2014 on MTV, marking the first time the show aired on a night other than a Wednesday since season 14 aired in 2007. The season concluded its run on June 26, 2014 with the Reunion special.

Contestants

Jersey numbers
For the first time in the show's history, each contestant had numbers on the backs of their jerseys. All of the male contestants wore odd-numbered jerseys, while the females wore even-numbered jerseys.

Format
Prior to each challenge, host T. J. Lavin will announce to each contestant as to whether a challenge will be declared as either an individual, pair, or team challenge. For pair and team challenges, T. J. draws names out of a bag — one of each gender, or more for multi-team or pair challenges — that will be designated as captains. For team challenges, the captains will select players that will be split evenly amongst gender. For pair challenges, the captains will either select players of the opposite gender for challenges that are designated as male/female pairs, or the same gender for challenges that are designated as same-gender pairs.

After each challenge, the winning teams/pairs/players are not only safe from elimination, but will also choose one player of each gender to compete in the elimination round. If a challenge is played in a team or pair format, each member of the winning pair/team is safe from elimination. The losing players will participate in an elimination vote called "The Draw," in which each player will either flip over a "kill card," which has a skeleton symbol, or a blank card. If a player flips over a blank card, that player saves himself/herself from participating in the elimination, however, if a player flips over the "kill card," that player will face the player of the respective gender that was previously voted by the winning team/pair/individual in the elimination. The winning players of each gender return to the game and have a shot at competing for a $350,000 prize, while the losing male and female players are eliminated from the game.

At the end of the season, six players will compete in the final challenge — three of each gender. The first-place finishers each win $125,000, second-place contestants each win $35,000 and third-place contestants each win $15,000.

Gameplay

Challenge games
Out on a Ledge: Played in two teams of 14 players, each team participates in a multi-stage race to the top of Montevideo's World Trade Center. The teams are then split up into three teams — two of four players and one of six players. The three teams are positioned at three different locations — one four-player team is chained together at the rooftop next to a locked box at a puzzle station, another four-player team is chained together at a plank hanging from the edge of the rooftop, while the six-player team is chained together at the base of the building.
In Phase 1, the two six-player teams race against each other through all 42 stories of the World Trade Center, and each team is possessing a key that is required to unchain their respective 4-player team that is chained together at the locked box, where Phase 2 begins.
In Phase 2, one four-player team uses a key to unlock a box which contains puzzle pieces. When that team solves their puzzle, another key is retrieved to unchain the other four-player team standing by near the plank.
In Phase 3, players from the remaining four-player teams have to race along a plank suspended 450 feet above ground level, one player at a time, then retrieve a pink flag sitting in the middle of a rolling log, and ring a bell in the fastest time possible. The entire challenge is a timed event, and the team that completes the challenge in the fastest time wins, while all members of the losing team are automatically sent to "The Draw."
Winners: Team Black (Aneesa, Bananas, Cohutta, CT, Devyn, Jasmine, Jessica, Johnny, Jordan, Laurel, Nany, Nia, Preston, and Swift)
Auto Body Rally: Played in male/female pairs, each pair has to race in a sports car on a drag strip, then run around a series of hay bales, and ride together on an oversize bicycle within an obstacle course consisting of bales of hay, toward a finish line. When each pair rides the bicycle, one player has to backwards-steer the front of the bicycle while the other pedals in order to navigate through the obstacle course. The team with the fastest time wins the challenge, while the teams with the four slowest times are automatically sent to "The Draw."
Winners: Cohutta and Laurel
Bar Crawl: A giant wall, with platforms on both sides, numerous holes horizontally-aligned at the base of the wall and two oversize bars in two holes, is suspended from a crane over water. Played in teams of four (two players on both sides of the wall), each team has to advance from one platform to the other by using the bars as a "walkway." Players on each side have to shove the bars through the holes in order for their partners to advance forward on the bars. It is a timed event, and the team that advances all of their players from one platform to the other in the fastest time wins, while the teams with the two slowest times are automatically sent to "The Draw." A team is disqualified if they do not complete the challenge within a time limit, or if any team member drops a bar into the water.
Winners: Team Brandon (Brandon, Bananas, Camila and Jessica)
Bounce Out: First, players are separated into two teams of 11 players. Then, the two teams are split into two groups — of six and five players. Each player wears oversize plastic bumper suits with pictures of their faces on them, and the groups have to designate one player to serve as "the ball", in which that player try to advance from one side of a beach to another, toward a soccer goal. The remaining players either try to defend their own goal or help escort the designated "ball" toward their opponent's goal. After one group scores a goal, the other group takes the field and try to do the same. The first team to score three goals wins the challenge, while all members of the losing team are automatically sent to "The Draw."
Winners: Team Red (Bananas, CT, Jessica, Johnny, Jonna, Jordan, Laurel, Nany, Preston, Swift, and Theresa)
Piggy Back: First, players are separated into two teams of ten — five of each gender. Then, each team has to advance on ten hanging ropes from one platform to another that is suspended above water. After one player advances onto one rope, the next teammate has to use the first player as a "human bridge" in order to advance to the next rope. Subsequent players continue the process, until each player is hanging into their own rope, at which point, players continue to use their teammates as "human bridges" in order to reach the opposite platform. Players are disqualified if they don't grab each rope. The team that advances the most players from one platform to the other in the fastest time wins, while all members of the losing team are automatically sent to "The Draw."
Winners: Team Purple (Cara Maria, Devyn, Jessica, Johnny, Jonna, Jordan, Leroy, Swift, Theresa, and Zach)
Smarty Pants: Played as an individual challenge, host T. J. Lavin asks each player a series of trivia questions, which includes spelling, sports, geography, pop culture, and U.S. history. The challenge is played in multiple rounds — separated by gender. Each player is hanging by a rope from a platform suspended above water, and if they correctly answer a question, they will stay in the game, but will get a red X for each wrong answer. If a player gets two red X's, he/she is dropped into the water. The first four players of each gender to be dropped into the water are automatically sent to "The Draw", while the last player of each gender standing wins the challenge.
Winners: Zach and Devyn
Sausage Party: Played as an individual challenge, players have to roll themselves along a "barbecue-style" obstacle course on the beach, while covered in shrink wrap. The challenge is played in two separate heats — one for each gender. Player wiggle and roll through a variety of "condiments" and on oversize metal bars that resemble a grill grate, towards a series of oversize circular discs at the end of the course that resemble bread buns. The first player that makes his/her way through the course and onto the oversize "bread buns" wins, while the three players in each heat that do not make it to the buns are automatically sent to "The Draw."
Winners: Johnny and Laurel
Hold That Pose: Played in two teams of seven, all members of each team have to grab hold of a certain color of rope with their feet and hands. There are two ropes with 28 straps — four straps for each player, and once the hands and feet of each player are strapped in, all team members have to hold a pose above the sand for one minute. The first team to hold a pose for one minute without any players touching the ground wins, while all members of the losing team are automatically sent to "The Draw."
Winners: Team Devyn (Devyn, Cara Maria, CT, Jessica, Leroy, Nany, and Zach)
Dug Out: Much like the "T-Bone" elimination from Rivals, players run up and down, through intersecting half-pipes that are dug several feet deep, and have to transfer five colored balls to their partner's ball rack from one side to the other. The challenge is played in same-gender pairs — one round for each gender, and the pair that transfers all of their colored balls — 10 total — to each other's racks wins, while the remaining players are sent to "The Draw."
Winners: CT and Zach & Nany and Theresa
Crossover: Played in male/female pairs, each pair has to advance through a lagoon toward a sandbar, where two designated treasure chests are buried. Inside the treasure chests are oversize puzzle pieces that pairs need to assemble their puzzles. One partner digs through the sand to retrieve the pieces from one chest, then each pair advances back across the lagoon to the sandbar, where the other partner has to digs through the sand in order to retrieve the pieces from the second chest, the players finally advance back across the lagoon to reach their designated puzzle station. The first pair to solve the puzzle wins, while the two last-place pairs are automatically sent to "The Draw."
Winners: Bananas and Nany

Elimination games
Balls In: Each player is given five chances to get as many balls inside a barrel, located in the middle of a large circle. If a player is either knocked out of or steps out of the ring, or if the ball is knocked out of the ring, their ball is considered "dead." Players alternate between offense and defense in each round. The player who has more baskets than their opponent after five rounds wins the elimination round. Note: Challenge previously used during The Inferno II and Spring Break Challenge.
Played by: Chet vs. Frank, Jemmye vs. LaToya, Bananas vs. Isaac, Jasmine vs. Laurel, Cara Maria vs. Jessica and Cohutta vs. Leroy.
Wrecking Wall: Each player must punch through a 30-foot dry wall to make holes so they can climb up until they can reach a bell. The first player to ring the bell wins the elimination round.
Played by: Dustin vs. Frank, Emilee vs. Jonna, Bananas vs. Jordan, Aneesa vs. Jonna, CT vs. Leroy, and Cara Maria vs. Laurel
Looper: Each player has a rope hooked to their backs and has to run around two posts to reach a bell. The first player to ring the bell wins the elimination round. After its original appearance, a rope was added to each post, allowing competitors to use it to make pulling their opponent easier.
Played by: Cara Maria vs. Nia, Jordan vs. Swift and Camila vs. Theresa
Oppenheimer: Each player must run across a caged circle hallway and passed the other player to ring a bell. The first player to ring the bell twice wins the elimination round.
Played by: Cara Maria vs. LaToya, Brandon vs. Zach, Cohutta vs. Preston and Aneesa vs. Laurel
Puzzle Pyramid: Each player has three puzzles to solve. After solving one puzzle, they will step up onto a podium until they reach the final puzzle. The first person to complete all three puzzles and ring the bell wins.
Played by: Bananas vs. CT and Laurel vs. Theresa

Final challenge
The final challenge is a five-stage competition in a race to the top of Villarica. The first three stages are male/female pairs, while the last two stages are individual competitions. Each guy is paired with each girl in the initial three stages. When each player reaches the top of the volcano, their accumulated times from each stage are added up. The guy and girl with the fastest accumulated times win $125,000 apiece. The second-place finishers win $35,000 each, while the third-place finishers win $15,000 each. However, prior to the start of the race, host T. J. Lavin explained to the contestants that a player must complete all five stages of the final challenge in order to get paid.

 Stage 1: Each pair races in a kayak. Bananas is paired with Laurel, Johnny is paired with Nany, and Zach is paired with Devyn.
 Bananas and Laurel – 40 minutes
 Nany and Johnny – 44 minutes 53 seconds
 Zach and Devyn – 58 minutes 21 seconds
 Stage 2: Each pair races in a 10K run which gains  through a mountain trail. Johnny is paired with Laurel, Zach is paired with Nany, and Bananas is paired with Devyn. At the end of the trail, each pair has to solve a puzzle entitled "Latitude Problems", in which they have to stack a series of wooden discs in a pole that contain city names in geographical order from north to south. If a pair does not correctly solve the puzzle within a 30-minute time limit, they are permitted to reach the finish line to complete Stage 2.
 Johnny and Laurel – 1 hour 23 minutes 54 seconds
 Zach and Nany – 1 hour 30 minutes
 Bananas and Devyn – 1 hour 34 minutes 47 seconds
After Stage 2, the total times are:
 Johnny – 2 hours 8 minutes 54 seconds
 Bananas – 2 hours 14 minutes 47 seconds
 Zach – 2 hours 28 minutes 21 seconds
 Laurel – 2 hours 3 minutes 54 seconds
 Nany – 2 hours 14 minutes 53 seconds
 Devyn – 2 hours 33 minutes 8 seconds
 Stage 3: Each pair has to climb up a steep and rocky mountainside. Bananas is paired with Nany, Zach is paired with Laurel and Johnny is paired with Devyn. Due to the steep and rocky terrain, pairs are given staggered starts every 15 minutes in random order.
 Bananas and Nany – 2 hours 19 minutes 14 seconds
 Zach and Laurel – 2 hours 39 minutes 36 seconds
 Johnny and Devyn – 2 hours 52 minutes 45 seconds
After Stage 3, the total times are:
 Bananas – 4 hours 34 minutes 1 second
 Johnny – 5 hours 1 minute 32 seconds
 Zach – 5 hours 7 minutes 57 seconds
 Nany – 4 hours 34 minutes 7 seconds
 Laurel – 4 hours 43 minutes 30 seconds
 Devyn – 5 hours 25 minutes 53 seconds
 Stage 4: Each contestant has to pedal 25 miles on a stationary bike before seeking a meal and overnight rest in a nearby tent.
 Bananas – 1 hour 1 minute
 Johnny – 1 hour 23 minutes
 Zach – 1 hour 31 minutes
 Laurel – 1 hour 32 minutes
 Nany – 1 hour 50 minutes
 Devyn – 2 hours 43 minutes
After Stage 4, the total times are (with previous seconds rounded to the nearest minute since seconds are no longer reported):
 Bananas – 5 hours 35 minutes
 Johnny – 6 hours 25 minutes
 Zach – 6 hours 39 minutes
 Laurel – 6 hours 16 minutes
 Nany – 6 hours 24 minutes
 Devyn – 8 hours 9 minutes
 Stage 5: Each competitor has to climb up the snow-covered slopes of Villarica.
 Johnny – 2 hours 4 minutes
 Bananas – 2 hours 36 minutes
 Laurel – 3 hours 10 minutes 38 seconds
 Nany – 3 hours 10 minutes 42 seconds
 Zach – 3 hours 37 minutes
 Devyn – 4 hours 30 minutes

Overall placement and time
 Males
 Bananas – 8 hours 11 minutes (winner)
 Johnny – 8 hours 29 minutes (second place)
 Zach – 10 hours 16 minutes (third place)
 Females
 Laurel – 9 hours 26 minutes (winner)
 Nany – 9 hours 34 minutes (second place)
 Devyn – 12 hours 39 minutes (third-place)

Game summary

Elimination chart

Episode progress

Competition
 The contestant won the competition
 The contestant did not win the final challenge
 The contestant won the week's competition, making him/her safe from the elimination round
 The contestant did not win the week's competition, but was not selected for the elimination round
 The contestant participated in the elimination draw, but did not draw the "kill card"
 The contestant was selected for the elimination round, but did not have to compete
 The contestant won the elimination round
 The contestant lost the elimination round
 The contestant withdrew from the elimination round due to injury
 The contestant was removed from the competition due to medical reasons

Voting progress

Team selections
Bold indicates team captains

Episodes

Reunion special
The Reunion special aired on June 26, 2014, after the season finale and was hosted by Jonny Moseley. The cast members who attended the reunion were Bananas, Johnny, Zach, CT, Cohutta, Jordan, Laurel, Nany, Devyn, Theresa, Cara Maria, and Jessica.

Notes

References

External links
 

MTV
Free Agents
Entertainment in Uruguay
2014 American television seasons
Television shows filmed in Uruguay
Television shows filmed in Chile